Meridensia is an extinct genus of prehistoric ray-finned fish.

See also

 Prehistoric fish
 List of prehistoric bony fish

References

Prehistoric ray-finned fish genera
Triassic bony fish
Prehistoric neopterygii
Triassic fish of Europe